Tyulgan may refer to:
Tyulgan, Chapayevsky Selsoviet, Tyulgansky District, Orenburg Oblast, a station in Chapayevsky Selsoviet
Tyulgan, Tyulgansky Settlement Council, Tyulgansky District, Orenburg Oblast, a settlement in Tyulgansky Settlement Council